The Metropolitan may refer to:

 The Metropolitan (Atlanta business and arts district), a complex of former warehouses turned into lofts and studios in Adair Park, Atlanta
 The Metropolitan (Atlanta condominium building)
 The Metropolitan (Rochester), a skyscraper in Rochester, New York, formerly Chase Tower
 The Metropolitan (newspaper),  the school newspaper of Metropolitan State College of Denver
 The Metropolitan Hotel, a 2005 album released by American country music artist Chely Wright
 The Metropolitan (ATC), a horse race at Randwick Racecourse in Sydney, Australia
 Metropolitan Handicap, a horse race at Belmont Park in Elmont, New York, U.S.A.

See also
 Metropolitan (disambiguation)